Alphalaelaps is a genus of mites in the family Laelapidae.

Species
 Alphalaelaps aplodontiae (Jellison, 1945)

References

Laelapidae